Drimoleague railway station was on the Ilen Valley Railway in County Cork, Ireland.

History
 
The station opened on 23 July 1877.

Regular passenger services were withdrawn on 1 April 1961.

Routes

Further reading

References

Disused railway stations in County Cork
Railway stations opened in 1877
Railway stations closed in 1961
1877 establishments in Ireland
Railway stations in the Republic of Ireland opened in the 19th century